"Old soldiers never die" is an English language catchphrase, with the full version being "Old soldiers never die, they simply fade away". It is made from a stanza from the soldiers' folklore song Old Soldiers Never Die:

Old soldiers never die,
Never die, never die,
Old soldiers never die,
They simply fade away.

The song itself is a British Army's parody of the gospel song Kind Thoughts Can Never Die.

In the United States, the phrase was used by General Douglas MacArthur in his April 19, 1951 farewell address to the U.S. Congress (which has become known as the "Old Soldiers Never Die" speech):

The phrase generated a host of joke snowclones, such as:
Old programmers never die, they just branch to a new address
Old policemen never die, they just cop out
Old pilots never die, they just go to a higher plane.
Old fishermen never die, they just smell that way.
In a 1980 interview with Barbara Walters on ABC's program 20/20, former president Richard Nixon paraphrased MacArthur and the catchphrase for himself by saying "Old politicians usually die, but they never fade away."

In Sting's 2016 album "57th & 9th", the second single, “50,000”, contains the line of verse “Rock stars don't ever die, they only fade away” as a tribute to Prince, David Bowie, Glenn Frey, and Lemmy Kilmister.

The song was recorded by Bing Crosby during a broadcast of his radio show in 1951 and later released on Decca Records.

References

Snowclones
English phrases
Songs about soldiers
Songs about the military